
This is a timeline of Russian history, comprising important legal and territorial changes and political events in Russia and its predecessor states. To read about the background to these events, see History of Russia. See also the list of leaders of Russia.

Dates before 31 January 1918, when the Bolshevik government adopted the Gregorian calendar, are given in the Old Style Julian calendar.

 Centuries: 9th10th11th12th13th14th15th16th17th
18th19th20th21stSee alsoFurther reading

9th century

10th century

11th century

12th century

13th century

14th century

15th century

16th century

17th century

18th century

19th century

20th century

21st century

See also
 Years in Russia, 1991–present
Cities in Russia
 Timeline of Grozny 
 Timeline of Kaliningrad 
 Timeline of Kazan
 Timeline of Krasnodar
 Timeline of Makhachkala 
 Timeline of Moscow 
 Timeline of Nizhny Novgorod
 Timeline of Novosibirsk
 Timeline of Omsk
 Timeline of Pskov
 Timeline of Rostov-on-Don
 Timeline of Saint Petersburg 
 Timeline of Samara
 Timeline of Smolensk
 Timeline of Vladivostok
 Timeline of Volgograd
 Timeline of Voronezh
 Timeline of Yekaterinburg

Further reading

Published in the 19th century

Published in the 20th century

Published in the 21st century

References

External links
 
 
 

 

Russia